In chemistry, molecular oxohalides (oxyhalides) are a group of chemical compounds in which both oxygen and halogen atoms are attached to another chemical element A in a single molecule. They have the general formula , where X = fluorine (F), chlorine (Cl), bromine (Br), and/or iodine (I). The element A may be a main group element,  a transition element or an actinide. The term oxohalide, or oxyhalide, may also refer to minerals and other crystalline substances with the same overall chemical formula, but having an ionic structure.

Synthesis

Oxohalides can be seen as compounds intermediate between oxides and halides. There are three general methods of synthesis:
Partial oxidation of a halide: 
2 PCl3 + O2 -> 2 POCl3
In this example, the oxidation state increases by two and the electrical charge is unchanged.
Partial halogenation of an oxide:
2 V2O5 + 6 Cl2 + 3 C -> 4 VOCl3 + 3 CO2
Oxide replacement: 
[CrO4]^2- + 2 Cl- + 4 H+ -> CrO2Cl2 + 4 H2O

Properties
In relation to the oxide or halide, for a given oxidation state of an element A, if two halogen atoms replace one oxygen atom, or vice versa, the overall charge on the molecule is unchanged and the coordination number of the central atom decreases by one. For example, both phosphorus oxychloride and phosphorus pentachloride, are neutral covalent compounds of phosphorus in the +5 oxidation state. If an oxygen atom is simply replaced by a halogen atom the charge increases by +1, but the coordination number is unchanged. This is illustrated by the reaction of a mixture of a chromate or dichromate salt and potassium chloride with concentrated sulfuric acid.
[Cr2O7]^2- + 4 Cl- + 6 H+ -> 2 CrO2Cl2 + 3 H2O
The chromyl chloride produced has no electrical charge and is a volatile covalent molecule that can be distilled out of the reaction mixture.

Oxohalides of elements in high oxidation states are strong oxidizing agents, with oxidizing power similar to the corresponding oxide or halide. Most oxohalides are easily hydrolyzed. For example, chromyl chloride is hydrolyzed to chromate in the reverse of the synthetic reaction, above. The driving force for this reaction is the formation of A-O bonds which are stronger than A-Cl bonds. This gives a favourable enthalpy contribution to the Gibbs free energy change for the reaction

Many oxohalides can act as Lewis acids. This is particularly so with oxohalides of coordination number 3 or 4 which, in accepting one or more electron pairs from a Lewis base, become 5- or 6- coordinate. Oxohalide anions such as  can be seen as acid-base complexes of the oxohalide with more halide ions acting as Lewis bases.

The vibrational spectra of many oxohalides have been assigned in detail. They give useful information on relative bond strengths. The difference is much too large to be due to the different masses of O and F atoms. Rather, it shows that the Cr–O bond is much stronger than the Cr–F bond. M–O bonds are generally considered to be double bonds and this is backed up by measurements of M–O bond lengths. It implies that the elements A and O are chemically bound together by a σ bond and a π bond.

Oxohalides of elements in high oxidation states are intensely coloured owing to ligand to metal charge transfer (LMCT) transitions.

Main group elements

Carbon group: Carbon forms oxohalides , X = F, Br, and the very toxic phosgene (X = Cl), which is produced industrially by a carbon-catalyzed reaction of carbon monoxide with chlorine. It is a useful reagent in organic chemistry for the formation of carbonyl compounds. For example,
COCl2 + 2 ROH -> CO(OR)2 + 2 HCl
Pnictogens: Nitrogen  forms two series of oxohalides with nitrogen in oxidation states 3, NOX, X = F, Cl, Br and 5, X = F, Cl. They are made by halogenation of nitrogen oxides. Note that  is isoelectronic with the nitrate ion, . Only oxohalides of phosphorus(V) are known.
Chalcogens: Sulfur forms oxohalides in oxidation state +4, such as thionyl chloride,  and oxidation state +6, such as sulfuryl fluoride, sulfuryl chloride, and thionyl tetrafluoride. All are easily hydrolyzed. Indeed, thionyl chloride can be used as a dehydration agent as the water molecules are converted into gaseous products, leaving behind the anhydrous solid chloride.
MgCl2*6H2O + 6 SOCl2 -> MgCl2 + 6 SO2 + 12 HCl
Selenium and tellurium form similar compounds and also the oxo-bridged species  (A = S, Se, Te). They are non-linear with the A-O-A angle of 142.5, 142.4 and 145.5° for S, Se and Te, respectively. The tellurium anion , known as teflate, is a large and rather stable anion, useful for forming stable salts with large cations.
Noble gases: xenon oxytetrafluoride, xenon dioxydifluoride and xenon oxydifluoride

Transition metals and actinides

A selection of known oxohalides of transition metals is shown below, and more detailed lists are available in the literature. X indicates various halides, most often F and Cl.

High oxidation states of the metal are dictated by the fact that oxygen is a strong oxidizing agent, as is fluorine. Bromine and iodine are relatively weak oxidizing agents, so fewer oxobromides and oxoiodides are known. Structures for compounds with d0 configuration are predicted by VSEPR theory. The d1 complex  is square pyramidal.

Each metal has an octahedral environment. The unusual linear  structure can be rationalized in terms of molecular orbital theory, indicating the presence of dπ — pπ bonding between the metal and oxygen atoms.

Similar species exist for neptunium and plutonium.

Minerals and ionic compounds

Bismuth oxochloride (BiOCl, bismoclite) is a rare example of a mineral oxohalide. The crystal structure has a tetragonal symmetry and can be thought of as consisting of layers of Cl−, Bi3+ and O2− ions, in the order Cl-Bi-O-Bi-Cl-Cl-Bi-O-Bi-Cl. This layered, graphite-like structure results in a relatively low hardness of bismoclite (Mohs 2–2.5) and most other oxohalide minerals. Those other minerals include terlinguaite Hg2OCl, formed by the weathering of mercury-containing minerals. Mendipite, Pb3O2Cl2, formed from an original deposit of lead sulfide in a number of stages is another example of a secondary oxohalide mineral.

The elements iron, antimony, bismuth and lanthanum form oxochlorides of general formula MOCl. MOBr and MOI are also known for Sb and Bi. Many of their crystal structures have been determined.

See also 
Transition metal oxo complex

References

Bibliography

Housecroft, C. E. and Sharpe, A. G. Inorganic Chemistry, 2nd ed., Pearson Prentice-Hall 2005. 
Shrivr, D. F. and Atkins, P. W. Inorganic Chemistry, 3rd edn. Oxford University Press, 1999. 
.

Oxohalides